A Village council is a type of local government used in the Palestinian National Authority (PNA) for Palestinian localities that usually number between 800 and 3,000+ inhabitants. The village council is also known D-level municipalities. There are 220 village councils in the Palestinian territories.

Village councils could consist of three to eleven members, including a chairman, a deputy chairman and secretary. The chairman is the head of the council. Unlike municipalities, village councils do not hold elections; rather, the representatives of a village's largest clans choose a chairman who is then appointed by the Local Government Minister of the Palestinian National Authority.

See also 
List of cities in Palestinian Authority areas
Palestinian refugee camps

Subdivisions of the State of Palestine
 
Geography of the State of Palestine